Pleasant Goat and Big Big Wolf is a Chinese animated television series produced by Creative Power Entertaining. Its first season, containing 530 episodes, premiered on August 3, 2005, on the Children's Channel, Hangzhou Television in China, and it has made 24 seasons of television series, 12 seasons of web series, and 10 movies by February 2022.

For the first season of the television series, both the opening and the ending themes are "Biekan Wo Zhi Shi Yizhi Yang" ("Even Though I'm Just a Little Goat") by Ivy Koo.

The second season, titled Pleasant Goat Sports Game ("A Goats' Sports Meeting") and containing 60 episodes, began airing on October 23, 2008, on CCTV-14. Both the opening and the ending themes are "Biekan Wo Zhi Shi Yizhi Yang" by Ivy Koo.

The third season, titled Joys of Seasons ("A Goats' Happy Year") and containing 100 episodes, began airing on May 1, 2010, on Zhejiang Television (ZJTV). The opening theme is "Biekan Wo Zhi Shi Yizhi Yang" by Yang Peiyi and the ending theme is "Dajia Yiqi Xiyangyang" ("Let's Happy(or Weslie) Together") by Bibi Zhou. This season was also issued worldwide by Disney later.

The fourth season, titled Smart Dodging ("Weslie with Innovative Ideas") and containing 60 episodes, began broadcasting on July 1, 2011, on ZJTV. Both the opening and the ending themes are "Smart Dodging" by Xiyangyang Tongxing Hechangtuan ("Weslie Child Stars' Chorus").

The fifth season, titled Happy, Happy, Bang! Bang! ("Cheering for Happiness") and containing 100 episodes, began airing on October 15, 2011, on ZJTV. Both the opening theme and the ending theme are "Happy, Happy, Bang! Bang!" by Xiyangyang Tongsheng Hechangtuan ("Weslie Children's Chorus").

The sixth season, titled The Athletic Carousel ("The Great Alliance of Sports") and containing 60 episodes, aired between June 30 and July 3, 2012, on ZJTV. Both the opening theme and the ending theme are "Kuaile Jingji-chang" ("A Happy Arena") by Queena Cui.

The seventh season titled The Happy Diary ("The Happy Diary") began airing on December 8, 2012, on ZJTV, and it is made up of 60 episodes. Both the opening and the ending themes are "Biekan Wo Zhi Shi Yizhi Yang" by Ivy Koo.

The 60-episode eighth season with the title Happy Formula ("The Happy Formula") began airing on July 26, 2013, on CCTV-1. Both the opening and the ending themes are "Biekan Wo Zhi Shi Yizhi Yang" by Ivy Koo.

The ninth season is titled Paddi the Amazing Chef ("Paddi Becomes the Great Cook") and consist of 52 twenty-five-minute episodes. This season began its broadcast on December 20, 2013, on CCTV-1. Both the opening and the ending themes are "Paddi the Amazing Chef" by Purple Lee.

The tenth season titled Dear Little Wish ("The Goats' Little Wishes") includes 60 episodes. It began airing on July 30, 2014, on Aniworld Satellite Television (also known as Golden Eagle Cartoon Channel,  or ). Both the opening and the ending themes are "Dear Little Wish" by Purple Lee. This season was also issued in the US by Amazon.com.

The eleventh season named The Tailor's Closet ("The Great Adventure with the Closet") and made up of 60 episodes premiered on Aniworld TV on September 4, 2014. Both the opening and the ending themes are "Baibian Xiao Caifeng" ("The Ever-changing Tailors") by Purple Lee.

The twelfth season with the name Love You Babe ("Mom is Ecstatic") began broadcasting on Aniworld on February 12, 2015. It contains 60 episodes. Both the opening and the ending themes are "Love You Babe" by Purple Lee.

With the title Adventures in the Primitive World ("Adventures in the Primitive World"), the sixty-episode thirteenth season began airing on Aniworld (but BTV Kaku Kids Channel (formerly Kaku Animation Channel,  or ) surpassed Aniworld later though) on August 17, 2015. Both the opening and the ending themes are "Zhiji" ("Bosom Friends") by Purple Lee.

The fourteenth season titled Marching to the New Wonderland ("Marching to the World Happily (or Hip-hop)") has 60 episodes and began airing on January 15, 2016, on Aniworld. The opening theme is "Marching to the New Wonderland" by Purple Lee, and the ending theme is "Biekan Wo Zhi Shi Yizhi Yang" by Ivy Koo.

The fifteenth season is named The Little Detective ("Goats the Little Detectives"). It owns 60 episodes and premiered on July 9, 2016, on CCTV-14. The opening theme is "The Little Detective" by Li Jiji and Cou Shi, and the ending theme is "Biekan Wo Zhi Shi Yizhi Yang" by Ivy Koo.

As a sequel of Marching to the New Wonderland, the sixteenth season Adventures in the Sea ("Adventures in the Deep Sea") including 60 episodes firstly aired on January 9, 2017, on Aniworld TV. The opening theme is "Lanse Manyou" ("The Blue Wondering") by Hua Xue and the ending theme is "Biekan Wo Zhi Shi Yizhi Yang" by Ivy Koo.

The seventeenth season titled War of Invention ("The Great War of Invention") began broadcasting on July 12, 2017, on Aniworld. It includes 60 episodes. The opening theme is "War of Invention" by Huang Jing, and the ending theme is "Biekan Wo Zhi Shi Yizhi Yang" by Ivy Koo.

Titled Flying Island: The Sky Adventure  ("The Fantastic Sky Islands"), the 60-episode eighteenth season is the third series of the Marching to the New Wonderland series. It began airing on January 27, 2018, on Aniworld. The opening theme is "Xi-ha Chuang Yunduan" ("Marching to the Clouds Happily (or Hip-hop)") by Cou Shi, and the ending theme is "Marching to the New Wonderland" by Purple Lee.

The nineteenth season Mighty Little Defenders ("Goat Village's Defenders") is the second series of the War of Invention series. The season began broadcasting on Aniworld on January 18, 2019, and finished on January 26, 2019. The opening theme is "Yonggan Xiangqian" ("Marching Bravely") by Xie Lin, and the ending theme is "Biekan Wo Zhi Shi Yizhi Yang" by Ivy Koo.

The twentieth season Rescue Across Time ("Reinforcements that Cross Space-Time")  is a sequel of Mighty Little Defenders, however, this season is count as the fourth series of the Marching to the New Wonderland series. The season began broadcasting on Aniworld Satellite Television, Youku, Tudou, iQiyi, Tencent Video, Mango TV, PPTV, IPTV, OTT on July 12, 2019. The opening theme is "Shengli de Zhongdian" ("The Terminal of Victory") by Liufu Xinhong, and the ending theme is "Marching to the New Wonderland" by Purple Lee.

The twenty-first season The Intriguing Alien Guests ("Trolly Alien") is the second series of the Mighty Little Defenders series. This season began broadcasting on Aniworld on January 10, 2020. The opening theme is "Shouhu Zhiguang" (The Light of Defense) by Wei Zunguang and Xie Lin, and the ending theme is "Biekan Wo Zhi Shi Yizhi Yang" by Ivy Koo.	

The twenty-second season Against the Dark Force ("Rescue in the Foreign Country") is the third series of the Mighty Little Defenders series. This season began broadcasting on Aniworld Satellite Television, Youku, iQiyi, Tencent Video, Xigua Video, Mango TV, IPTV, OTT on July 17, 2020. The opening theme is "Jiuzai Shengbian" ("By Your Side") by Peng Zhenxian, and the ending theme is "Biekan Wo Zhi Shi Yizhi Yang" by Ivy Koo.

The twenty-third season Dunk for Victories ("Win the Basket") is the first series of the Yudong Yingxiong Zhuan ("Sports Heroes") series. This season began broadcasting on Aniworld Satellite Television, Youku, iQiyi, Tencent Video, Mango TV on January 22, 2021. The opening theme is "Xiwang Zhi Lan" ("The Basket of Hope") by Yi Qi, and the ending theme is "Biekan Wo Zhi Shi Yizhi Yang" by Ivy Koo.

The twenty-fourth season Ultimate Battle: The Next Generation ("Decisive Battle Times") is the fourth series of the Mighty Little Defenders series. This season premiered on Aniworld Satellite Television, Youku, Mango TV on July 9, 2021. The opening theme is "Chuangzao Weilai" ("Create the Future") by Xie Lin, and the ending theme is "Biekan Wo Zhi Shi Yizhi Yang" by Ivy Koo.

The twenty-fifth season The Great Rescue ("Wonderful Great Rescue") is the fifth series of the Mighty Little Defenders series and the second series of the Against the Dark Force series. This season premiered on Aniworld Satellite Television, Youku, iQiyi, Tencent Video, Mango TV on July 15, 2022. The opening theme is "Yueding" (约定, "Promise") by Xie Lin, and the ending theme is "Biekan Wo Zhi Shi Yizhi Yang" by Ivy Koo.

The twenty-sixth season The Season Towns ("Enter the Four Seasons City Bravely") is the sixth series of the Mighty Little Defenders series. This season premiered on Aniworld Satellite Television, Youku, Mango TV on January 6, 2023. The opening theme is "Yongzhe Zhi Lu" (勇者之路, "The Hero's Road") by Cai Wen Hao, and the ending theme is "Biekan Wo Zhi Shi Yizhi Yang" by Ivy Koo.

The series is also made into web animations. The first season of the web series is titled Around the World in 20 Days ("Weslie Travels Around the World Expo"), and premiered on BesTV IPTV Platform on August 1, 2010. This season contains 20 episodes.

The second web animation titled Everyday Pleasant Goat ("Triumphantly Weslie") premiered on eSurfing iCartoons and includes 365 episodes.

The third related web animation is titled Man Jing Tou ("Slow Motion" or "Comic Shot") and owns 60 episodes. It premiered on November 24, 2016, and on many Chinese video websites including Iqiyi, Sohu Video, Kumi and PPTV. Both the opening and the ending themes of this season are "Biekan Wo Zhi Shi Yizhi Yang" by Ivy Koo.

The series also has three independent subseries of web animations, Pleasant Goat Fun Class (including six seasons: Animals & Plants ("The Chapter of Animals & Plants") in July, 2016, Sports are fun ("The Chapter of Sports") in  July, 2016, The Earth Carnival in July, 2017, Travel Around The World ("Goats Traveling Around the World") in December, 2017, Idiom World ("Amazing Book of Idioms") in February, 2018, and Finding Treasures ("Goats Finding Treasures") in February, 2018, Mighty Goat Squad Series() (including two seasons: Mighty Goat Squad, "Goats Go to Adventures") in August, 2020 and Mighty Goat Squad 2 ("Goats Go to Adventures 2") in November, 2021 and Mr.Wolffy, Mr.Right! ("Marry Wolffy If You Want to Get Married") in February, 2017.

The series also made 8 animated features films: Pleasant Goat and Big Big Wolf - The Super Adventure in 2009, Pleasant Goat and Big Big Wolf – Desert Trek: The Adventure of the Lost Totem ( or ) in 2010, Pleasant Goat and Big Big Wolf – Moon Castle: The Space Adventure in 2011, Pleasant Goat and Big Big Wolf – Mission Incredible: Adventures on the Dragon's Trail in 2012, Pleasant Goat and Big Big Wolf – The Mythical Ark: Adventures in Love & Happiness in 2013, Pleasant Goat and Big Big Wolf – Meet the Pegasus in 2014 and Pleasant Goat and Big Big Wolf – Amazing Pleasant Goat in 2015. The eighth animated film Pleasant Goat and Big Big Wolf: Dunk for Future was on-air during the Chinese New Year in 2022.

It is also made into two live-action animated films: Pleasant Goat and Big Big Wolf - I Love Wolffy in 2012 and Pleasant Goat and Big Big Wolf - I Love Wolffy 2 in 2013.

The First Season

Pleasant Goat Sports Game

Around the World in 20 Days

Joys of Seasons

Smart Dodging

Happy, Happy, Bang! Bang!

The Athletic Carousel

The Happy Diary

Happy Formula

Paddi the Amazing Chef

Dear Little Wish

The Tailor's Closet

Love You Babe

Everyday Pleasant Goat

Adventures in the Primitive World

Marching to the New Wonderland

The Little Detective

Man Jing Tou

Adventures in the Sea

War of Invention

Flying Island: The Sky Adventure

Mighty Little Defenders

Rescue Across Time

The Intriguing Alien Guests

Against the Dark Force

Dunk for Victories

Ultimate Battle: The Next Generation

The Great Rescue

The Season Towns

Note

References 

Episodes
Lists of Chinese animated television series episodes